Absolute Beginners is a 1986 British musical film adapted from Colin MacInnes' book about life in late 1950s London, directed by Julien Temple. The film stars Eddie O' Connell, Patsy Kensit, James Fox, Edward Tudor-Pole, Anita Morris, and David Bowie, with featured appearances by Sade Adu, Ray Davies, and Steven Berkoff. It was screened out of competition at the 1986 Cannes Film Festival. It received coverage in the British media but was panned by critics and became a box office failure, although modern reviews have been more favourable. Bowie's theme song was very popular in the UK, spending nine weeks on the charts and peaking at number two.

The commercial failure of Absolute Beginners and two other films is blamed for the collapse of British film studio Goldcrest Films.

Plot
Taking place in 1958, popular culture in London is transforming from 1950s jazz to a new generation on the verge of the rock and roll 1960s. Young photographer Colin is in love with aspiring fashion designer Crepe Suzette. Colin aims to be an artist with integrity. Suzette's boss, famous designer Henley of Mayfair, takes advantage of her forward-thinking designs to boost his own image.

Colin lives in the poor, ethnically diverse neighbourhood of Notting Hill. To make money, he gets a job with music producer Harry Charms, taking photos of new teen idol Baby Boom. Despite Colin getting commercial photography work, Suzette breaks up with him. She explains that she wants a successful and luxurious life, and won't settle for less ("Having It All"). Colin is initially despondent, but believes she'll eventually come back to him.

Colin learns that Suzette will be at a party hosted by gossip columnist Dido Lament, and so he attends. He learns Suzette plans to marry the middle-aged, homosexual Henley for her career ("Selling Out"). Colin also meets advertising mogul Vendice Partners at the party.

Meanwhile, the Teddy Boy subculture is increasingly hostile towards Black residents in London, spurred by the recent rise in immigration. The White Defence League, led by the Fanatic, preaches fascist politics and is vehemently against the increasing ethnic diversity of London. Colin despises this racist ideology.

Partners brings Colin to his advertising agency, where he shows off plans for the White Housing Development. Partners offers Colin a position as an advertisement photographer. While hesitant at first, Colin takes the job in the hopes that money may help him win back Suzette ("That's Motivation").

Henley and Suzette marry, but she is deeply unhappy. Colin, Dido, and Charms go on the TV show Searchlight. Dido gropes Colin, prompting him to have an outbust and rail against the elder generation trying to exploit teenagers. Later, at a jazz club, Colin is commended for his honesty on television. However, he's upset when he sees a newspaper headline about Suzette's wedding ("Killer Blow").

Racial violence intensifies in the area. Colin's Black friend, Mr. Cool, informs him that the racists are becoming more organized and dangerous. Colin discovers that the new White Housing Development is a scheme between Partners and Henley to "redevelop" the "West 11." Colin sends incriminating photos to Dido in an attempt to reveal the plan, but she's in cahoots with Partners and is no help.

Colin witnesses the 1958 Notting Hill race riots ("Riot City"). His pleas for peace are ignored. The police eventually arrive and stop the violence. Colin finds Suzette and they flee a fire set by the WDL. Mr. Cool has a fight with the Fanatic and wins. There is celebratory dancing in the street as rain puts out the fires. Colin and Suzette go back to his flat and have sex. He throws her wedding ring out the window.

Cast

 Eddie O'Connell as Colin
 Patsy Kensit as Crepe Suzette
 James Fox as Henley of Mayfair
 David Bowie as Vendice Partners
 Edward Tudor-Pole as Ed the Ted 
 Anita Morris as Dido Lament
 Graham Fletcher-Cook as Wizard
 Tony Hippolyte as Mr. Cool
 Bruce Payne as Flikker
 Paul Rhys as Dean Swift
 Lionel Blair as Harry Charms
 Eve Ferret as Big Jill
 Ray Davies as Arthur 
 Sade as Athene Duncannon
 Mandy Rice-Davies as Mum
 Julian Firth as The Misery Kid
 Alan Freeman as Call-Me-Cobber
 Steven Berkoff as The Fanatic
 Chris Pitt as Baby Boom
 Gary Beadle as Johnny Wonder
 Robbie Coltrane as Mario
 Carmen Ejogo as Carmen
 Ronald Fraser as Amberley Drove
 Joe McKenna as Fabulous Hoplite
 Irene Handl as Mrs. Larkin
 Peter-Hugo Daly as Vern
 Sylvia Syms as Cynthia Eve
 Slim Gaillard as Lloyd
 Eric Sykes as Arcade Worker

Production
Christopher Wicking worked on an early draft of the script which he said "had some sort of propulsion from one scene to the next". He says the script helped raise American finance but then Julien Temple became involved and disregarded a lot of Wicking's ideas. Wicking also says the filmmakers could never reconcile if the musical numbers should advance the story or illustrate something about the characters at the time.

$2.5 million of the film's budget came from Orion and £2.5 million from Goldcrest.

Soundtrack
Absolute Beginners: The Original Motion Picture Soundtrack was concurrently released to promote the film, and the musical score was composed by Gil Evans. David Bowie's title track, Ray Davies' "Quiet Life", and the Style Council's "Have You Ever Had It Blue?" were released as singles. Abridged versions of the LP were released featuring only sides one and two, and CD versions excised the tracks "Absolute Beginners (Slight Refrain)," "Landlords and Tenants", "Santa Lucia". and "Cool Napoli".

Track listing

Charts

Reception

Critical
New York Times film critic Caryn James remarked upon the "unevenness" of Temple's adaptation and its "erratic" results. Pauline Kael declared that the music was "peculiarly unlyrical and ephemeral". Jeremy Allen in The Guardian praised Bowie's theme song but described the film as "an overbudget turkey of huge proportions". Corey K. Creekmur stated in The International Film Musical that the film "failed to deliver on the critical expectations surrounding it", although it remained "a deeply interesting, if flawed, attempt to harness the contemporary musical in the services of politics and social equality".

Alex Stewart reviewed Absolute Beginners for White Dwarf #79, and stated that "It's glossy, slick and superficial, with a couple of nods towards Social Significance which stand out almost as awkwardly as the stumps of the subplots that ended up on the cutting-room floor. On the other hand the singing and dancing are quite nice, the climax looks uncannily like Quatermass and the Pit set to music, and the grossly over-hyped Patsy Kensit duly meets a most satisfying nemesis by turning in a performance that would have disgraced an episode of Thunderbirds."

Absolute Beginners currently holds a 78% rating on Rotten Tomatoes, based on nine reviews.

Box office
Goldcrest Films invested £4,680,000 in the film and received £1,859,000 back, losing £2,821,000.

References
Notes

Sources

External links
 
 
 
 
 

1986 films
1986 drama films
1980s coming-of-age drama films
1980s musical drama films
1980s teen drama films
British coming-of-age drama films
British musical drama films
British teen drama films
1980s English-language films
Films about fashion designers
Films about photographers
Films directed by Julien Temple
Films set in 1958
Films set in London
Films shot at Pinewood Studios
Films shot in London
Films shot in Surrey
Golan-Globus films
Goldcrest Films films
Orion Pictures films
Palace Pictures films
Rock musicals
Teen musical films
1980s British films